Chiretolpis signata is a moth of the subfamily Arctiinae. It is found on the Louisiade Archipelago.

References

Nudariina
Moths of New Guinea